Pilot Glacier is a short, deeply entrenched tributary glacier in the Mountaineer Range, descending along the southeast side of Deception Plateau to enter Aviator Glacier, in Victoria Land. Named by the northern party of New Zealand Geological Survey Antarctic Expedition (NZGSAE), 1962–63, in recognition of services rendered by pilots of U.S. Navy Squadron VX-6 in Antarctica, and in association with Aviator Glacier.

Glaciers of Victoria Land
Borchgrevink Coast